Simon is a French flash-animated television series based on Stéphanie Blake’s books published by L’Ecole des Loisirs, directed by Julien Cayot, adapted by Thomas Forwood and Stéphanie Blake and produced by GO-N Productions with the participation of France Télévisions. The show centers on an anthropomorphic rabbit named Simon. The series premiered in France on December 17, 2016 on French channel France 5 before being exported across the world.

Plot
The series focuses on a cute anthropomorphic rabbit named Simon, who lives with his parents Andre and Eva and little brother Gaspard and a pet orange cat named Milou and they go on many adventures.

Cast

French
Salomé Keren Zeitoun as Simon, an anthropomorphic 5 year old white rabbit.
Magalie Bonfils as Eva
Mathias Casartelli as André
Mahogany-Elfie Elis as Lou
Angèle Humeau as Patricia
Tony Sanial as Gaspard
Kylian Trouillard as Ferdinand
Charley Dethière as Ferdinand

English
Bisneado arlexo as Benjamin
Alex Starke as Simon
Loti Bailey as Lou
Hayden Conneti as Mamadou
Keith Faulkner as Grandpa 
Rudy Greatorex as Gaspard
Hari Patel as Gaspard from mid season 3 
Luke Haliwell as André
Jacob Preston as Ferdinand
Joanna Ruiz as Eva, Patricia, Grandma

Episodes

References

External links
 Official website at France 5
 Official website at Go-N Productions
 Official website at TVNZ+

2010s French animated television series
2016 French television series debuts
French flash animated television series
French children's animated comedy television series
French children's animated drama television series
French television shows based on children's books
English-language television shows
French-language television shows
France Télévisions children's television series
Cartoon Network original programming
Animated television series about rabbits and hares
Animated television series about children
Television pilots not picked up as a series